The Rat Race is a 1960 American drama film adapted from the play of the same name by Garson Kanin. Directed by Robert Mulligan, it stars Tony Curtis and Debbie Reynolds as struggling young entertainment professionals in New York City. Filming took place in Pittsburgh, Pennsylvania. Sam Butera and Gerry Mulligan have minor roles as saxophonists.

Plot 
Wishing to pursue a career as a jazz saxophonist, Pete Hammond Jr. takes a bus from his home in Milwaukee, Wisconsin, to New York City and optimistically begins looking for work. However, jobs are extremely hard to find. He crosses paths with Peggy Brown, a model and taxi dancer who has become jaded and cynical after years of struggling to survive in the city. She has just been evicted from an apartment rented to Pete, and because she is penniless and has no home to return to, he offers to let her stay with him. She is forced to rely on his generosity, and as the two of them work at various low-paying jobs, they stay together in the apartment as friends.

Peggy warns him that people cannot be trusted, but Pete is encouraged when a band auditions him for a job. When the other musicians send him out for beer, Pete returns to find that they have stolen his instruments and that he is the victim of a scam, thus proving Peggy right. Pete lands a job as an "alto man" on a cruise ship but has no instruments. Peggy goes to the abusive taxi dance hall owner she works for, Nelly Miller (Don Rickles), to whom she is already in debt, for another loan to give to Pete and agrees to prostitute herself with his patrons to pay back her debts. Maintaining a cynical front, Peggy convinces a suspicious Pete that she got the money with "no strings attached".

Pete writes Peggy daily throughout the next month while on the cruise. When she stalls at fulfilling her end of their deal, Nelly strips Peggy of her dress and shoes to make his point that he owns her. She runs out on their deal again the night Pete returns, and Nelly threatens to disfigure her. In love with Peggy and afraid for her, Pete gives up all his wages, his wristwatch and his new instruments to pay off Nelly. Later, Pete confesses to Peggy that he "mixed" with three women as part of his cruise job. Peggy agrees to stay with Pete but tells him that he should stop working on cruise ships.

Cast
 Tony Curtis as Pete Hammond Jr.
 Debbie Reynolds as Peggy Brown
 Jack Oakie as Mac
 Kay Medford as Mrs. 'Soda' Gallo
 Don Rickles as Nelly Miller
 Marjorie Bennett as Mrs. Edie Kerry
 Hal K. Dawson as Bo Kerry
 Norman Fell as Telephone Repairman
 Sam Butera as Carl 'Tip'
 Joe Bushkin as Frankie Jay, the pianist in the band who took Pete's instruments.
 Gerry Mulligan as Gerry
 Elmer Bernstein as a member of The Red Peppers

See also
 List of American films of 1960

References

External links
 
 
 

1960 films
1960 romantic comedy films
American romantic comedy films
1960s English-language films
Films scored by Elmer Bernstein
Films about entertainers
Films directed by Robert Mulligan
Films shot in Pennsylvania
Films set in New York City
Paramount Pictures films
Jazz films
Films produced by William Perlberg
Films produced by George Seaton
1960s American films